The Girl Who Wouldn't Quit is a 1918 American silent drama film directed by Edgar Jones and starring Louise Lovely, Henry A. Barrows and Mark Fenton.

Cast
 Louise Lovely as Joan Tracy
 Henry A. Barrows as Roscoe Tracy
 Mark Fenton as Joshua Siddons
 Charles Hill Mailes as Robert Carter 
 Gertrude Astor as Stella Carter
 William Chester as Joe Morgan
 Philo McCullough as Jim Younger

References

Bibliography
 Robert B. Connelly. The Silents: Silent Feature Films, 1910-36, Volume 40, Issue 2. December Press, 1998.

External links
 

1918 films
1918 drama films
1910s English-language films
American silent feature films
Silent American drama films
American black-and-white films
Universal Pictures films
Films directed by Edgar Jones
Films based on works by James Oliver Curwood
1910s American films